Alexander Mullings Sanders, Jr. (born September 29, 1939) is an American politician from the state of South Carolina.  He is the former chief judge of the South Carolina Court of Appeals (1983–1992) and was the 19th President of the College of Charleston (1992–2001).  In 2002, he was the Democratic candidate for the U.S. Senate seat left vacant after the retirement of Strom Thurmond. He was defeated by the Republican candidate, U.S. Representative Lindsey Graham.

Sanders was born in and grew up in Columbia, South Carolina and attended AC Moore Elementary School, Hand Middle School, and Dreher High School.  He received degrees from the University of South Carolina and the University of Virginia.  He later taught in the Political Science Department at Harvard University.

As one of five founders, Sanders was the President of the Charleston School of Law from its founding in 2002 until 2013.

Judge Sanders currently teaches courses in the Political Science Department at the College of Charleston.

References

Harvard University faculty
University of South Carolina alumni
University of Virginia alumni
South Carolina state court judges
South Carolina Democrats
Living people
Presidents of the College of Charleston
1939 births